Qezeljeh-ye Olya (also Romanized as Qezeljeh-ye ‘Olyā) is a village in Qanibeyglu Rural District, Zanjanrud District, Zanjan County, Zanjan Province, Iran. At the 2006 census, its population was 243, in 46 families.

References 

Populated places in Zanjan County